Qusheh Qui (also Romanized as Qūsheh Qū’ī, Ghoosheh Ghoo’i, Gosheh Kūyu, Qowsheh Qū’ī, and Qūshah Qū’ī) is a village in Hesar-e Valiyeasr Rural District, Central District, Avaj County, Qazvin Province, Iran. At the 2006 census, its population was 187, in 41 families.

References 

Populated places in Avaj County